Robert Gardner Bartle (November 20, 1927 – September 18, 2003) was an American mathematician specializing in real analysis. He is known for writing the popular textbooks The Elements of Real Analysis (1964), The Elements of Integration (1966), and Introduction to Real Analysis (2011) published by John Wiley & Sons. 

Bartle was born in Kansas City, Missouri, and was the son of Glenn G. Bartle and Wanda M. Bartle.
He was married to Doris Sponenberg Bartle (born 1927) from 1952 to 1982 and they had two sons, James A. Bartle (born 1955) and John R. Bartle (born 1958). He was on the faculty of the Department of Mathematics at the University of Illinois from 1955 to 1990.

Bartle was Executive Editor of Mathematical Reviews from 1976 to 1978 and from 1986 to 1990. From 1990 to 1999 he taught at Eastern Michigan University. In 1997, he earned a writing award from the Mathematical Association of America for his paper "Return to the Riemann Integral".

References

 Robert G. Bartle (1990) "A brief history of the mathematical literature".
 Jane E. Kister & Donald R. Sherbert (2004) "Robert G. Bartle (1927 — 2003)". Notices of the American Mathematical Society 51(2):239–40.

External links
 
 

1927 births
2003 deaths
Functional analysts
Mathematical analysts
Scientists from Kansas City, Missouri
Mathematicians from Missouri
Scientists from Missouri
American textbook writers
University of Illinois faculty
Eastern Michigan University faculty